Hindalco Industries Limited an Indian aluminium and copper manufacturing company, is a subsidiary of the Aditya Birla Group. Its headquarters are at Mumbai, Maharashtra, India.

The company has annual sales of 25 billion and employs around 20,000 people. It is listed in the Forbes Global 2000 at 895th rank. Its market capitalisation by the end of May 2013 was US$3.4 billion. Hindalco is one of the world's largest aluminium rolling companies and one of the biggest producers of primary aluminium in Asia.

History
The Hindustan Aluminium Corporation Limited was established in 1958 by the Aditya Birla Group.  In 1962 the company began production in Renukoot in Uttar Pradesh making 20 thousand metric tons per year of aluminium metal and 40 thousand metric tons per year of alumina.  In 1989 the company was restructured and renamed Hindalco. Ramdev Singh was the first trade union leader of Hindalco Industries Limited, Renukoot.

Operations

Power plants
 Renusagar Power Plant. An 826.57 MW (10 generating units of various capacities) captive power plant which is about 40 km from Renukoot, Sonebhadra district, Uttar Pradesh.
 Hirakud Captive Power Plant. A 467.5 MW captive power plant located at Hirakud, Sambalpur District, Odisha. This plant supplies power to Hirakud smelter of Hindalco Industries.
Utkal Alumina Captive Power Plant. A 90 MW captive power plant located at Doraguda, Rayagada District, Odisha. This plant supplies power to Utkal Refinery of Hindalco Industries.
 Aditya Captive Power Plant. A 900 MW captive power plant located at Lapanga, Sambalpur District, Odisha. This plant supplies power to Aditya smelter of Hindalco Industries.
 Mahan Hindalco Industries Ltd. a 900 MW captive power plant and alumina smelter located in Bargawa 20 km from Singrauli.

Novelis 
On 11 February 2007, the company entered into an agreement to acquire the American company Novelis for 6 billion, making the combined entity the world's largest rolled-aluminium producer. At 2007 Novelis was the world's largest producer of rolled aluminium and a major recycler of aluminium cans. On 15 May 2007, the acquisition was completed with Novelis shareholders receiving $44.93 per outstanding share of common stock.

Novelis operates as an independent subsidiary with its own leadership team and remains headquartered in Atlanta, Georgia. It is incorporated in Delaware.

Hindalco, through its wholly owned subsidiary AV Metals Inc., acquired 75,415,536 common shares of Novelis, representing 100 percent of the issued and outstanding common shares. Immediately after closing, AV Metals Inc. transferred the common shares of Novelis to its wholly owned subsidiary AV Aluminum Inc. When Hindalco made this bid in 2007 this became the largest Indian investment in North America and the second-largest overseas investment by an Indian company (behind Tata Steel Europe's purchase of Corus two weeks earlier) to this time.

The day after Hindalco announced the acquisition its stock fell by 13% resulting in a 600 million drop in market capitalisation. Shareholders criticised the deal but Kumar Mangalam Birla responded that he had offered a fair price for the company and stated, "When you are acquiring a world leader you will have to pay a premium."

Other acquisitions
In June 2000, acquisition of controlling stake in Indian Aluminium Company Limited (Indal) with 74.6 per cent equity holding.

In July 2007, Hindalco announced it is acquiring the stake of Alcan Inc. in the Utkal Alumina Project located in Doraguda, Odisha.

On 15 April 2020, Novelis  acquired US-based Aluminium rolled products manufacturer Aleris Corporation. Hindalco's Novelis' entry into the high-end aerospace segment, this deal has been closed at an enterprise value of $2.8 billion.

Listings and shareholding
The equity shares of Hindalco are listed on the Bombay Stock Exchange, where it is a constituent of the BSE SENSEX index, and the National Stock Exchange of India, where it is a constituent of the S&P CNX Nifty. Its Global depository receipts are listed on the Luxembourg Stock Exchange.

As on 31 March 2022, the promoters Aditya Birla Group held around 34.64% equity shares in Hindalco. Over 408,000 individual shareholders hold approx. 9% of its shares.

Financials 
Hindalco Industries reported 43,351 crores as its total revenue, while its profit was 993 crores in the financial year 2021.

See also 

 Grasim Industries
 Hindustan Copper

References

External links
 
 Business data for Hindalco Industries: Reuters Google Finance BloombergQuint

Manufacturing companies based in Mumbai
Mining companies of India
Copper mining companies of India
Aditya Birla Group
NIFTY 50
Aluminium companies of India
Manufacturing companies established in 1958
Multinational companies headquartered in India
Indian companies established in 1958
Indian brands
Manufacturing plants in Uttar Pradesh
Hindalco Industries
1958 establishments in Bombay State
Companies listed on the National Stock Exchange of India
Companies listed on the Bombay Stock Exchange